Kenneth Douglas Stewart Anderson (8 March 1910 – 30 August 1974) was an Indian writer and hunter who wrote books about his adventures in the jungles of South India.

Biography 
Kenneth Anderson was born in Bolarum, Secunderabad and came from a Scottish family that settled in India for six generations. His father Douglas Stuart Anderson was superintendent of the F.C.M.A. in Poona, Bombay Presidency and dealt with the salaries paid to military personnel, having an honorary rank of captain. His mother Lucy Ann Taylor née Bailey was the grand-daughter of John Taylor who, for his services, had been gifted land in Bangalore by Sir Mark Cubbon.  Douglas like most Scottish soldiers took an interest in sport hunting and influenced Kenneth's interest in the outdoors and hunting.

Anderson went to Bishop Cotton Boys' School and also studied at St Joseph's College, Bangalore. He was sent to study law at Edinburgh, Scotland but he quit studies and returned to India. He worked for fifteen years in the posts and telegraph department and later worked at the British Aircraft Factory in Bangalore (later HAL) in the rank of Factory Manager for Planning. He owned nearly 200 acres of land across Karnataka, Hyderabad and Tamil Nadu. In 1972 he was diagnosed with cancer from which he died in 1974. He was buried at the Hosur road cemetery.

Family
Anderson met Cheryl Majoire Blossom Minnette née Fleming who came from Sri lanka (her mother Millicient Toussaint was a Burgher while her father Clifford Fleming was from Australia) at Bowring Club in Bangalore. They  married in April 1929 at Sorkalpet, Cuddalore, then had a daughter named June (born 19 June 1930) and a son named Donald (18 February 1934 - 12 July 2014) who also took an interest in hunting. The couple separated in later life; Kenneth Anderson moved to Whitefield, while Blossom stayed on at Prospect House, their home on Sydney Road (now Kasturba Road). Blossom died  on 11 March 1987.

Outdoors and writings 
His love for the inhabitants of the Indian jungle led him to big game hunting and to writing real-life adventure stories. He often went into the jungle alone and unarmed to meditate and enjoy the beauty of untouched nature. As a hunter, he tracked down man-eating tigers and leopards. His kills include the Sloth bear of Mysore, the Leopard of Gummalapur, the Rogue Elephant of Panapatti, the Leopard of the Yellagiri Hills, the Tigress of Jowlagiri, the Tiger of Segur and the Tiger of Mundachipallam.

He is officially recorded as having shot 8 man-eating leopards (7 males and 1 female) and 7 tigers (5 males and 2 females) on the Government records from 1939 to 1966 though he is rumored to have unofficially shot over 18 man eating panthers and over 15–20-man eating tigers. He also shot a few rogue elephants.

Anderson's style of writing is descriptive, as he talks about his adventures with wild animals. While most stories are about hunting tigers and leopards – particularly man-eaters – he includes chapters on his first-hand encounters with elephants, bison, and bears. There are stories about the less 'popular' creatures like Indian wild dogs, hyenas, and snakes. He explains the habits and personalities of these animals.

Anderson gives insights into the people of the Indian jungles of his time, with woods full of wildlife and local inhabitants having to contend with poor quality roads, communication and health facilities. His books delve into the habits of the jungle tribes, their survival skills, and their day-to-day lives.

He also explored the occult, and wrote about his experiences for which he had no explanation. He always wore a talisman to protect him from danger, miraculously produced from the air by his friend the great Satya Saibaba. He was often sought to shoot man-eaters in villages in southern India. He spoke Kannada, the language of his home town Bangalore, and Tamil, a language of the neighboring state of Tamilnadu. He had a Studebaker car and usually hunted with a .405 Winchester Model 1895 rifle. He was a pioneer of wildlife conservation in southern India, and spent his later years "shooting" with a camera.

Anderson expounds his love for India, its people, and its jungles. He believed in the power of alternative medicine and carried a box containing natural herbs from the jungle. He refused most treatments based on Western medicine and died of prostate cancer. (However, when he was mauled by a man-eating tiger, he took penicillin to counter the possible infection.) This incident is described in his book Man Eaters and Jungle Killers in the chapter entitled "The Maurauder of Kempekarai". His last book, Jungles Long Ago, was published posthumously. He wrote a novel called the Fires of Passion which highlighted the situation of the Scottish people in South India.

In his introduction to Tales from the Indian Jungle, Anderson writes: "He [Anderson] appears to be of the jungle himself, and we get the impression that he belongs there. This is the home for him and here is the place he would want to die; the jungle is his birthplace, his heaven and his resting place when the end comes."

Jungle folk
Anderson became well acquainted with many jungle folk from various aborigine tribes; Byra the Poojare from the Poojaree tribe, Ranga a petty shikari who also occasionally took to poaching, and Rachen from the Sholaga tribe. Some of his friends such as Hughie Hailstone also had estates in South India and he also tells us about Eric Newcombe, his friend from his young days who used to get into a lot of trouble.

Books

Hunting books 
 Nine Maneaters And One Rogue (1954)
 Man Eaters and Jungle Killers (1957)
 The Black Panther of Sivanipalli and Other Adventures of the Indian Jungle (1959)
 The Call of the Man Eater (1961)
 This is the Jungle (1964)
 The Tiger Roars (1967)
 Tales from the Indian Jungle (1970)
 Jungles Long Ago (1976)
 The Bond Of Love

Other publications 
 The Fires of Passion (1969)
 Jungles Tales for Children (1971)
 Tales of Man Singh: King of Indian Dacoits (1961)

Omnibus editions 
Kenneth Anderson Omnibus Vol. 1
 Tales from the Indian Jungle
 Man Eaters and Jungle Killers

Kenneth Anderson Omnibus Vol.2
 The Call of the Man Eater
 The Black Panther of Sivanipalli and Other Adventures of the Indian Jungle

Kenneth Anderson Omnibus Vol.3
 The Tiger Roars
 Jungles Long Ago
 The Jungle Book

Translations
Anderson's books have been translated into many languages. Popular Kannada writer Poornachandra Tejaswi has translated some of his hunting experiences into Kannada which were published in 4 volumes as Kadina Kategalu (Volume 1 - 4)/ಕಾಡಿನ ಕತೆಗಳು (ಭಾಗ ೧ - ೪)

See also 
 Frederick Walter Champion, wildlife photographer and conservationist of Shivalik Hills
 Jim Corbett, wildlife conservationist of Shivalik Hills 
 Hunter-naturalists of India
 List of famous big game hunters
 Project Tiger

References

External links 

 Biography of Donald Anderson, Kenneth's son
  Hunting Tales of Kenneth Anderson in Urdu-Part 01-شکاریات-منتخب کردہ دلچسپ کہانیاں-حصہ اول-راشد اشرف 

1910 births
1974 deaths
Indian conservationists
Indian hunters
Indian naturalists
Writers from Bangalore
Indian people of Scottish descent
St. Joseph's College, Bangalore alumni
Bishop Cotton Boys' School alumni
20th-century naturalists
Hunters in British India